James Pim was the key person to the establishment and operation of the first passenger railway in Ireland, the Dublin and Kingstown Railway (D&KR), and the first commercial atmospheric railway in the world, the Dalkey Atmospheric Railway.

Biography  

James Pim (1796–1856), often distinguished from his father as junior, originated from a branch of the Pim Quaker family of Mountmellick that moved to Dublin in 1795.  His father was James Pim Senior, who had corn merchant interests, and was a cousin of Thomas, Jonathan and Joseph Pim.

The appears to be a record to a marriage on 11 November 1823 to Eliza Hogg of Redford, County Tyrone, daughter of Johnathan Hogg, at the Friend's Meeting-house Dungannon.

Pim set up a stockbroking business in 1824, this requiring relatively little capital but would have required personal securities which could have been backed by members of his kin.  He acquired the Dublin agency for the Imperial Fire Assurance Company from his father.  He began buying stock in the Grand Canal Company when it was available cheaply; building up a holding of £5,600 by 1830, which was available as collateral for other loans.  Shepherd notes he was described as "a man of rare ability and was to prove his worth in future negotiations with the Great Western Railway".

An AGM report from 1827 for The Retreat at Bloomfield, a Dublin institution for persons afflicted with disorders of the mind shows James Pim as committee treasurer and several other family and business associates on the committee as directors.

By 1833 James Pim was a partner in Boyle, Low, Bickerstaff and Pim., stockbrokers and bankers.  The resources of the firm was later to prove useful in providing working capital for the early stage of setup of the Dublin and Kingstown Railway.

Involved with a group looking at a canal transport solutions from Kingstown Harbour to Dublin James Pim was the prominent member of a breakaway section who were aware of the development of the Liverpool and Manchester Railway and stood as guarantor for Alexander Nimmo to perform a survey for a railway alternative.

The Act for formation of the D&KR gaining Royal assent on 6 September 1831 and at a meeting of the D&KR committee on 2 December 1831 James Pim was appointed Secretary, a position he had held in provisional committee and was noted for taking a disproportionately large share of the burden in obtaining the Act.
The D&KR company records of 18 May 1932 records of James Pim: "The present favourable prospects of the company are principally owing to the great personal exertions of James Pim".  He was also appointed Treasurer on that date.  The vacant position of "Clerk of the Company" was taken by Thomas F. Bergin, an engineer by profession.  Bergin oversaw the daily operations of the D&KR and Murray notes Bergin and James Pim "were to make an excellent team".

James Pim successfully negotiated a Board of Public Works loan with a series of letters backed by increasing security guarantees until the loan was forthcoming.
During the construction Pim had to work in conjunction with the consulting engineer Charles Blacker Vignoles to smooth out minor construction problems and workmen injuries.

When the D&KR initially raised a bill in 1833 to extend the D&KR to Dalkey there was considerable opposition and a select committee Pim made some progress when cross-examining opposition witnesses but ultimately the bill had to be dropped.  A subsequent 1834 Bill for a small extension to Kingstown was successful though Pim had to do careful negotiations with the Admiralty including a possible Compensation Harbour.

In 1840 D&KR officers and directors visited the Clegg and Samuda Brothers demonstration atmospheric railway at Wormwood Scrubbs.  James Pim became an avid enthusiast and favourable argreements were negotiated to install the world's first commercial system between Kingstown and Dalkey, with trials from August 1843 and public opening in March 1844.  The Dalkey atmospheric was to operate moderately effectively albeit not necessarily economically and not without difficulties for ten years.  More controversially Pim also put forward a proposal for the Great Southern and Western Railway (GS&WR) Dublin to Cork mainline to be built as an atmospheric railway alongside the Grand, but was severely rebuked by the GS&WR's Sir John Benjamin Macneill who pointed out the engineering impracticalities and conflict of interest an efficient GS&WR would have on the Grand Canal and Pim's stockholding in it.

In the mid 1840s the Waterford, Wexford, Wicklow and Dublin Railway (WWW&DR) startup supported by the Great Western Railway (GWR) indicated intentions to build a line from Dublin to Bray and then further South.  Ultimately James Pim advised the D&KR board they should negotiate terms to lease the D&KR to the WWW&DR and agreement were sealed in three acts in 1846.  Ten years later the WWW&DR exercised those rights and the D&KR ceased to be a train operating company.

James Pim's health had suffered with negotiations with the GWR in London in 1845 both physically and mentally, though he continued negotiations with the WWW&DR up time of his death with the implementation of the lease to the WWW&DR in 1956.  The £1,800 voted to him by the D&KR shareholders on the day of his death went to his widow.

Family associations
Pim's father, James Pim senior, acquired control of the City Quay brewing interest of Richard Pim.  Control passed to Henry, brother of James junior before merging into Jameson's.

Various other relatives of James Pim were also involved with the Dublin and Kingston Railway.  Thomas Pim served on the D&KR provisional committee and was appointed chairman of the board of directors on 2 December 1892.  Richard Pim initially worked for the D&KR at the Serpentine Avenue before a spell at Rothwell and Company locomotive builders in England before being invited to Grand Canal Street Works where was responsible for its Princess locomotive.  An 1887 report by Grierson indicates a Joseph B. Pim was the secretary of the D&KR at that time.

James and Eliza had 11 offspring.  Isabella, Charlotte and Jane; collectively known as the Pim Sisters were known for there associations with a Cholera Hospital at 87 Georges Street Kingstown and through their friendship with Alice Grahame, fiancé of Wellesley Bailey, did critical fundraising to assist Bailey create The Leprosy Mission. His son Johnathan Greenwood Pim was also involved in railways and was locomotive superintendent on the Waterford and Limerick Railway from 1857 until the time his contract was not renewed in 1861 and he was replaced by Martin Atock.

Bibliography

Notes

References

Sources
 
 
 
 
 
 
 
 

Irish Quakers
1796 births
1856 deaths